Lee Hyun-soo (born 24 January 1968) is a South Korean fencer. He competed in the team sabre event at the 1988 Summer Olympics.

References

External links
 

1968 births
Living people
South Korean male sabre fencers
Olympic fencers of South Korea
Fencers at the 1988 Summer Olympics
Asian Games medalists in fencing
Fencers at the 1990 Asian Games
Fencers at the 1994 Asian Games
Fencers at the 1998 Asian Games
Asian Games gold medalists for South Korea
Asian Games silver medalists for South Korea
Medalists at the 1990 Asian Games
Medalists at the 1994 Asian Games
Medalists at the 1998 Asian Games